Phước Tân may refer to several places in Vietnam, including:

Phước Tân, Khánh Hòa, a ward of Nha Trang
Phước Tân, Biên Hòa, a ward of Biên Hòa
Phước Tân, Ninh Thuận, a commune of Bác Ái District
Phước Tân, Bình Phước, a commune of Phú Riềng District
Phước Tân, Phú Yên, a commune of Sơn Hòa District
Phước Tân, Bà Rịa-Vũng Tàu, a commune of Xuyên Mộc District